The Goldwing Ltd Goldwing is an American ultralight aircraft that was designed by Craig Catto and Brian Glenn and produced by Goldwing Ltd. The aircraft was supplied as a complete factory-built aircraft only and no kits or plans were offered.

Design and development
Later models were made lighter and slower to fit FAR 103. It features a cantilever mid-wing, canard, a single-seat, open cockpit, tricycle landing gear and a single engine in pusher configuration.

The aircraft is made from molded fiberglass epoxy composites, including Kevlar, carbon-fiber-reinforced polymer and high-density foam. Its  span wing is built with a carbon epoxy spar, with the rest of the wing built from foam and covered with doped aircraft fabric covering. The wing features tip rudders and ailerons combined with spoilers for roll control. Pitch is controlled by the canard surface. The landing gear includes laminated fiberglass main gear legs and a steerable nosewheel. The aft-mounted powerplant was a  Kawasaki 440,  Cuyuna 430R or a  Rotax 277. The Goldwing has a 16:1 glide ratio.

In flight the aircraft is reported to be very pitch-sensitive.

Variants
Goldwing ST
Initial version; too heavy and fast for the US FAR 103 ultralight category.
Goldwing UL
Lightened version, with a standard empty weight of  that conforms to US FAR 103 requirements.

Specifications (Goldwing UL)

References

External links
Photo of Goldwing in flight
Photo of Goldwing in flight

1970s United States ultralight aircraft
Homebuilt aircraft
Single-engined pusher aircraft